The smalltooth sand tiger or bumpytail ragged-tooth (Odontaspis ferox) is a species of mackerel shark in the family Odontaspididae, with a patchy but worldwide distribution in tropical and warm temperate waters. They usually inhabit deepwater rocky habitats, though they are occasionally encountered in shallow water, and have been known to return to the same location year after year. This rare species is often mistaken for the much more common grey nurse shark (Carcharias taurus), from which it can be distinguished by its first dorsal fin, which is larger than the second and placed further forward. It grows to at least 4.1 m (13.5 ft) in length.

Very little is known of the biology and behavior of the smalltooth sand tiger. It is an active predator of benthic bony fishes, invertebrates, and cartilaginous fishes. This species is thought to be ovoviviparous with oophagous embryos like other mackerel sharks. In contrast to its formidable size and appearance, this shark is harmless, having never been known to behave aggressively towards humans. Concern exists that its numbers are declining due to human activities in the Mediterranean and elsewhere, though existing data are inadequate for a full assessment of its conservation status.

Taxonomy and phylogeny
The smalltooth sand tiger was originally described as Squalus ferox by Italian-French naturalist Antoine Risso in 1810, based on a specimen from Nice, France. In 1950, Gilbert Percy Whitley described O. herbsti from Australian specimens, separating them from O. ferox on the basis of dentition and the absence of spots. Leonard Compagno synonymized the two species in 1984, as subsequently discovered Pacific specimens had blurred Whitley's distinguishing characters. The specific epithet ferox is Latin for "fierce". Other common names for this shark include blue nurse shark, fierce shark, Herbst's nurse shark, and sand tiger shark.

A phylogenetic study based on mitochondrial DNA, performed by Naylor et al. in 1997, suggests that the smalltooth sand tiger and its relative, the bigeye sand tiger (O. noronhai), are more closely related to the thresher sharks than to the grey nurse shark, to which it bears a strong resemblance. If true, this would indicate that the similarities between this species and the grey nurse shark arose as the result of convergent evolution. Fossil teeth belonging to the smalltooth sand tiger have been found from Lower Pliocene  from 5.3 to 3.6 million years ago (Mya) in deposits in Italy and Venezuela.

Description
The smalltooth sand tiger has a bulky body with a long, bulbous, slightly flattened snout. The eyes are medium-sized, with large, round pupils (as opposed to slit-like in the grey nurse shark), and lack nictitating membranes.

The mouth is large and filled with projecting teeth. Each tooth has a narrow, tall central cusp flanked by two or three pairs of lateral cusplets. Some  48–56 tooth rows are in the upper jaw and 36–46 tooth rows are in the lower jaw; the front large teeth in the upper jaw are separated from the lateral teeth by two to five intermediate teeth.

The fins are broad-based and angular in shape. The first dorsal fin is larger than the second and placed closer to the pectoral fins than the pelvic fins. The caudal fin is strongly asymmetrical with the upper lobe much longer than the lower. The coloration is gray to gray-brown above and lighter below. Juveniles are uniform in color with darker fin margins, while adults often exhibit dark spots or blotches that vary widely in pattern, size, and density. Coloration also appears to vary by region, with some individuals from the Mediterranean displaying a patchy, "piebald" pattern. The smalltooth sand tiger attains a maximum length of 4.1 m (13.5 ft) and a maximum weight of 289 kg (637 lbs). There are unconfirmed reports of much larger individuals from Malpelo Island off Colombia.

Distribution and habitat

Smalltooth sand tigers have been caught at widely scattered locations throughout the world, indicating a possibly circumtropical distribution. In the eastern Atlantic Ocean, it is known from the Bay of Biscay south to Morocco, including the Mediterranean Sea, the Azores, and the Canary Islands. In 2023, the species was also found in The Solent after a dead smalltooth sand tiger washed ashore at Lepe, Hampshire. In the western Atlantic, it has been reported from off North Carolina and Florida (USA), the Yucatan Peninsula (Mexico), and Fernando de Noronha (Brazil). It occurs throughout the Indian Ocean, from South Africa, Madagascar, and Tanzania in the west to the Maldives and the Southwest Indian Ridge in the east. In the northern Pacific, it is known from off Japan, Hawaii, California, and Colombia, and in the southern Pacific it is known from New Caledonia, eastern Australia, and New Zealand. In New Zealand, this species can be found off the coasts of the Bay of Plenty, New Plymouth, and Hawkes Bay.  It has also been filmed near Raoul Island.

Typically regarded as a deepwater species, smalltooth sand tigers have been caught down to 880 m (2,900 ft). They are usually found near the bottom in rocky, boulder-strewn regions on continental shelves and the upper continental slope, as well as around submarine ridges and mountains. The species has been reported near the drop-offs of rocky or coral reefs and in the upper layers of the open ocean. In the Mediterranean, smalltooth sand tigers occur at depths less than 250 m (820 ft), including at depths accessible to divers. They have been seen swimming over sandy flats at Cocos Island and Fernando de Noronha. The temperature range favored by this species is 6–20 °C (43–63 °F); in hot climates, they are found below the thermocline in cooler water.

Biology and ecology

The smalltooth sand tiger is a strong-swimming shark that may be encountered singly or in aggregations of up to five individuals. Catch records suggest this species may cover long distances in oceanic waters along underwater ridges or "hopping" between seamounts. It has a very large, oily liver, which allows it to maintain neutral buoyancy in the water column with minimal effort. At a location called "Shark Point" off Beirut, Lebanon, small groups of smalltooth sand tigers appear every summer on rocky reefs at a depth of 30–45 m (100–150 ft). The same individuals have been documented returning to this site year after year. Their purpose there is unknown, being speculated to relate to mating. When confronted, these sharks have been observed to stall, gape their mouths, turn around, and shake their tails towards the perceived threat.

Adult smalltooth sand tigers have no known predators, though they are bitten by cookiecutter sharks (Isistius brasiliensis). A known parasite is the tapeworm Lithobothrium gracile, which infests the shark's spiral valve intestine. The carcass of a 3.7-m-long (12.1 ft) female found off Fuerteventura in the Canary Islands contained a number of snubnosed eels (Simenchelys parasitica) inside her heart, body cavity, and back muscles. Whether the eels contributed to the shark's death is unknown.

Feeding

Compared to the grey nurse shark, the dentition of the smalltooth sand tiger is less robust and lacks specialized cutting and crushing teeth, suggesting that it tends to tackle smaller prey. The diet of the smalltooth sand tiger consists of bottom-dwelling bony fishes such as rockfish (Sebastes spp.), invertebrates such as squid, shrimp, and possibly marine isopods, and cartilaginous fishes including rays and chimaeras. The largest known prey item taken by this species was a 1.3-m-long (4.3 ft)  kitefin shark (Dalatias licha), found inside the stomach of a 2.9-m-long (9.5 ft) male from New Caledonia.

Life history
No pregnant smalltooth sand tigers have ever been found; this species is presumed to be ovoviviparous as in other mackerel sharks. Villaviencio-Garayzar (1996) described a 3.6-m (11.8 ft) female from the Gulf of California that contained "hundreds of ova" in her right ovary, which would support the embryos being oophagous. Whether the embryos also cannibalize each other as in the grey nurse shark is unknown. The size at birth is estimated to be 1.0–1.1 m (3.3–3.6 ft). With a few recorded exceptions, juveniles are found in deep water and only adults are present above a depth of 200 m (660 ft); this may serve to reduce predation on young individuals by large, shallow-water predators such as the great white shark (Carcharodon carcharias). Males mature at a length of 2.0–2.5 m (6.6–8.2 ft) and females at a length of 3.0–3.5 m (9.4–11.5 ft). Faint scars seen on some individuals may be related to courtship.

Human interactions
Encounters with divers have shown that, despite their size, smalltooth sand tigers are docile and do not react aggressively even when closely approached. This species is taken as bycatch in gillnets and bottom trawls, and on longlines; most captures occur in the Mediterranean and off Japan. It is usually discarded when caught, except in Japan, where the meat is consumed (though considered very inferior to the grey nurse shark) and the liver oil is used. The fins, jaws, and cartilage are also of value.

Discoveries, beginning in the 1970s, of smalltooth sand tigers in shallow water have raised urgent conservation concerns, as this species is apparently more vulnerable to human activity than previously believed. At present, data are insufficient for the International Union for Conservation of Nature to assess the worldwide conservation status of this species. It has been assessed as vulnerable in Australian waters, due to a decline over 50% in catches off New South Wales since the 1970s. In June 2018, the New Zealand Department of Conservation classified the smalltooth sand tiger as "At Risk – Naturally Uncommon" with the qualifier "Threatened Overseas" under the New Zealand Threat Classification System.

Populations of this species in the Mediterranean are also believed to have declined, due to a combination of habitat degradation, overfishing, pollution, and human disturbance. The smalltooth sand tiger has been protected by the Australian government since 1984; this came about concurrently with protection for the grey nurse shark, which had been decimated in Australian waters, so as to prevent any claims of confusing one species for the other. However, these regulations have proven difficult to enforce.

References

External links

 Shark-References.com: "Species description of Odontaspis ferox"
 ReefQuest Centre for Shark Research: "Biology of the Ragged-Tooth Shark" (Odontaspis ferox)

smalltooth sand tiger
Fish of the Adriatic Sea
Fish of New Zealand
Fish of the Indian Ocean
Fish of Oceania
Fauna of the Yucatán Peninsula
Vulnerable animals
Vulnerable biota of Africa
Vulnerable fauna of Asia
Vulnerable biota of Europe
Vulnerable fauna of Oceania
smalltooth sand tiger
Taxa named by Antoine Risso